Sergei Yuryevich Ukharev (born 24 February 1985) is a former Russian professional football player.

Club career
He played in the Russian Football National League for FC SKA-Energiya Khabarovsk in 2005.

External links
 
 

1985 births
Living people
Russian footballers
Association football defenders
FC SKA-Khabarovsk players
FC Smena Komsomolsk-na-Amure players
FC Okean Nakhodka players
FC Novokuznetsk players
FC Amur Blagoveshchensk players